Meketichoffatia was a small mammal from the Upper Jurassic of Portugal.  It was a relatively early member of the extinct order Multituberculata. It lived at the same time as dinosaurs such as Allosaurus. It's within the suborder "Plagiaulacida" and family Paulchoffatiidae.

The genus Meketichoffatia was named by Hahn G. in 1993 based on a single species. Fossil remains of the species Meketichoffatia krausei consisting of two upper jaws were found in Kimmeridgian (Upper Jurassic)-age Camadas de Guimarota of  Guimarota, Portugal.

References
 Hahn (1993), "The systematic arrangement of the Paulchoffatiidae (Multituberculata) revisited". Geol. Paleontol. 27, p. 201-214.
 Hahn G & Hahn R (2000), "Multituberculates from the Guimarota mine", p. 97-107 in Martin T & Krebs B (eds), "Guimarota - A Jurassic Ecosystem", Verlag Dr Friedrich Pfeil, München.
 Kielan-Jaworowska Z & Hurum JH (2001), "Phylogeny and Systematics of multituberculate mammals". Paleontology 44, p. 389-429.
 Much of this information has been derived from  Multituberculata (Cope 1884).

Multituberculates
Late Jurassic mammals
Jurassic mammals of Europe
Prehistoric mammal genera